Last Words is the third single from the Dutch group Ten Sharp, released in January 1986. The song was written by the band and produced by Michiel Hoogenboezem. The single made it into the Dutch Top 40 Tip-charts. In March 1986, they shot a video for the song in De Posthoorn church in Amsterdam.

The B-side "White Gold" is a heavy slow song about the hunt on elephants in Africa. An edited version appeared on the "You" maxi-single.

Track listings
 7" single
 "Last Words" - 4:19
 "White Gold" - 3:41

 12" maxi
 "Last Words" (Extended Re-Mix) - 7:59
 "White Gold" - 3:41

Credits
 Produced by Michiel Hoogenboezem
 Engineered by Ronald Prent and Michiel Hoogenboezem
 Design: MaCo Productions

Musicians
 Vocals: Marcel Kapteijn
 Keyboards: Niels Hermes
 Guitars: Martin Boers
 Bass: Ton Groen
 Drums: Wil Bouwes

References

External links
 "Last Words" on Discogs.com
 The official Ten Sharp website

1986 singles
Ten Sharp songs